Club Bàsquet L'Hospitalet, also known as Torrons Vicens L'Hospitalet for sponsorship reasons, is a professional basketball team based in L'Hospitalet de Llobregat, Catalonia and plays in the Complex Esportiu L'Hospitalet Nord, in LEB Plata league.

CB L'Hospitalet organises annually the under-18 City of L'Hospitalet Tournament, integrated in the Euroleague Basketball Next Generation Tournament.

History
Founded in 1929, CB L'Hospitalet is one of the oldest basketball clubs in Spain. In their first years, the club achieved one Spanish Cup in 1940, became runner-up in the next year and in both seasons, it won two Catalan championships.

In 1974, CB L'Hospitalet achieved their first promotion ever to the National League, where it played until 1978. In 1983, after promoting again, L'Hospitalet became one of the founding clubs of the Liga ACB, but they only played the first season, as the club finished in the last position.

After several relegations, L'Hospitalet comes back to Liga EBA, third tier in that time, in 1999 and it becomes champion in the 2003–04 season, thus promoting to LEB 2, the new third division later renamed as LEB Plata.

The club achieves the league title in their debut season in the league, and promoted to LEB league, where they played three seasons until its relegation in 2008, achieving the qualification to the promotion playoffs to Liga ACB in 2006.

In 2010, L'Hospitalet could not register in LEB Plata due to the inability to meet the financial requirements and was dropped to the fifth tier, but came back to Liga EBA by achieving a vacant berth in the Group C.

In the 2015–16 season, L'Hospitalet registered a 30–2 record for promoting to LEB Plata, six years after the last time they played. The club was relegated again to Liga EBA. However, it remained in the league due to the existence of vacant places in it.

Season by season

Trophies and awards

Trophies
Spanish Cups: (1)
1940
2nd division Championships: (1)
2ª División: (1) 1974
LEB Plata: (1)
2005
Catalan Championship: (2)
1940, 1941

Individual awards
LEB Oro MVP
Thomas Terrell – 2006
LEB Plata MVP
Thomas Terrell – 2005

Notable players
 José Ángel Antelo
 Joan Creus
 Xavi Fernández
 Ferran Laviña
 Roger Grimau
 Edgar San Epifanio
 Thomas Terrell
  Serge Ibaka
 Chris Copeland

References

External links
Official CB L'Hospitalet page

Basketball teams established in 1929
L'Hspitalet
Former LEB Oro teams
Liga EBA teams
Former LEB Plata teams
Former Liga ACB teams
Sport in L'Hospitalet de Llobregat